"Let's Do It Again" is a song by the Staple Singers.  Written by Curtis Mayfield, it was part of the soundtrack for the Bill Cosby/Sidney Poitier film, Let's Do It Again. The single reached the top of the Billboard Hot 100 singles chart on December 27, 1975, the day before Roebuck "Pops" Staples' 61st birthday, and also spent two non-consecutive weeks at the top of the Hot Soul Singles chart. It was the last major hit by the group.

R&B quartet Xscape sampled the song on their first single, the remix of "Just Kickin' It", from the 1993 album Hummin' Comin' at 'Cha, produced by Jermaine Dupri. Ice Cube sampled the song for the remix of "It Was a Good Day". It was also sampled in John Legend's song "Number One". It's also sampled on BJ the Chicago Kid's single "Good Luv'n".

Charts

References

1975 singles
The Staple Singers songs
Billboard Hot 100 number-one singles
Cashbox number-one singles
Curtis Mayfield songs
Songs written for films
Songs written by Curtis Mayfield
Song recordings produced by Curtis Mayfield
1975 songs